John Bonk (born August 27, 1950 in Stoney Creek, Ontario) is a former all-star offensive lineman in the Canadian Football League. The four-time All-Star played from 1973 to 1985 for the Winnipeg Blue Bombers. Bonk won the CFL's Most Outstanding Offensive Lineman Award in 1984. He also won the 60th Grey Cup with Hamilton in 1972 and the 72nd Grey Cup with Winnipeg in 1984.

In 2008, John was inducted into the Canadian Football Hall of Fame.

References

1950 births
Living people
Hamilton Tiger-Cats players
Winnipeg Blue Bombers players
Players of Canadian football from Ontario
Canadian football offensive linemen
Canadian Football Hall of Fame inductees
Sportspeople from Hamilton, Ontario